Profitis Ilias (lit. Prophet Elias) may refer to:

 Elijah or Elias, a prophet in the Hebrew Bible, considered a saint by Christians
 Profitis Ilias, a neighborhood of Athens
 Skete of Prophet Elijah, a cenobitic skete of Pantokratoros monastery in Mount Athos
 Profitis Ilias, a subdivision of the city Kalamata

Churches
 Profitis Ilias Greek Orthodox Church, located near Endeavour, Saskatchewan, Canada
 Church of Prophet Elijah in Thessaloniki
 Profitis Ilias Church, located on top of Munichia
 Profitis Ilias Church, located in Protaras
 Profitis Elias Church, located near Pano Lefkara
 Profitis Ilias Monastery, located in Phocis
 Profitis Ilias, possible Peak Sanctuary associated with the Malia Palace

Mountains
 Profitis Ilias (2405 m), the highest peak of the Taygetus chain
 Profitis Ilias (1981 m), the highest peak of Mainalo and of the Menalon mountain range
 Profitis Ilias (798 m), a mountain on the Greek island of Rhodes
 Profitis Ilias (el) (567 m), a mountain on the Greek island of Santorini
 Profitis Ilias (el) (512 m), a mountain on the Greek island of Rhodes

el:Προφήτης Ηλίας (αποσαφήνιση)